The Sinclair Service Station is a historic automotive service station at 10782 Jacob Smart Boulevard (U.S. Route 17) in Ridgeland, South Carolina, United States.

Description
The structure is a single-story T-shaped masonry building with modest Mediterranean Revival styling.  A porte-cochère projects forward, across the area that originally housed gas pumps. It was built in 1937 by the Sinclair Oil Corporation, along what was the major coastal route in South Carolina until the construction of Interstate 95. The station closed in 1978, and has since seen other commercial uses.  It has been restored and now houses the Morris Center for Lowcountry Heritage. The building was listed on the National Register of Historic Places in 2015.

See also

 National Register of Historic Places listings in Jasper County, South Carolina

References

External links

Commercial buildings on the National Register of Historic Places in South Carolina
Buildings and structures in Jasper County, South Carolina
National Register of Historic Places in Jasper County, South Carolina
Sinclair Oil Corporation
1937 establishments in South Carolina